Anselmi Nurmela  (born 22 November 1996) is a Finnish professional footballer who plays as a midfielder for IL Hødd.

Club career
In 2016 Nurmela played 22 games for AC Oulu in the Finnish 1st Division Ykkönen before joining top division Veikkausliiga outfit Rovaniemen Palloseura. In 2017, Nurmela made 24 starts and five substitute appearances in the Finnish top division. In February 2018, Nurmela joined FC Flora in Estonia. With Flora Nurmela won the 2019 Estonian league title making 18 appearances and scoring two goals.

International career
On 24 March 2017, he made his debut with the Finland national under-21 football team in a friendly against Netherlands.

Personal life
He is the son of former Finnish international Mika Nurmela.

Honours
FC Flora
 2019 Meistriliiga

References

1996 births
Footballers from Emmen, Netherlands
Living people
Finnish footballers
Finland youth international footballers
Finland under-21 international footballers
Association football midfielders
AC Oulu players
Rovaniemen Palloseura players
FC Flora players
IL Hødd players
Veikkausliiga players
Ykkönen players
Meistriliiga players
Finnish expatriate footballers
Expatriate footballers in Estonia
Finnish expatriate sportspeople in Estonia
Expatriate footballers in Norway
Finnish expatriate sportspeople in Norway